Taylor Steele may refer to:
 Taylor Steele (figure skater)
 Taylor Steele (filmmaker)